To'uri Cave is a karst cave located on Mangaia, Cook Islands in the Tava'enga district. The cave contains two running subterranean streams, one freshwater and the other salt. There is a 400 metres sump inside the cave which ends in a permanent sump.

References

Caves of the Cook Islands